Lifers (stylized in all caps as LIFERS) is the ninth studio album by American alternative rock duo Local H, released on April 10, 2020 through AntiFragile. The album features the band working with engineer Steve Albini and appearances from Juliana Hatfield and John McCauley of Deer Tick.

The album was released on digital, CD, vinyl, and cassette tape formats. The record marks the second full-length studio recording to feature Ryan Harding on drums.

The album was preceded by a single for "Patrick Bateman", a song named after the American Psycho character. The single, which features a cover of Motörhead's "We Are the Road Crew" as the b-side, was released digitally on July 4, 2019 and as a 7" single on December 12, released by G&P Records.

Track listing

Personnel
Local H
Scott Lucas - Vocals, guitar
Ryan Harding - Drums

Additional personnel
Juliana Hatfield - vocals (on "Winter Western")
John McCauley (Deer Tick) - backing vocals (on "High, Wide and Stupid")
Gabe Rodriguez- backing vocals (on "High, Wide and Stupid")
Blake Smith - backing vocals (on "High, Wide and Stupid")
John Haggerty (Naked Raygun, Pegboy) - guitar solo (on "Beyond the Valley of Snakes")
The Chase Bliss Choir - falsetto gang vocals (on "Sunday Best")

Production
Andy Gerber - producer, recording; mixing on "Sunday Best"
Local H - producer
Steve Albini - recording
J. Robbins - mixing
Nick Tveitbakk - additional recording
Dave Lugo - additional recording
Dan Coutant - mastering

References

Further reading

External links
 

Local H albums
2020 albums